The Waffle House Index is an informal metric named after the ubiquitous Southern US restaurant chain Waffle House known for its 24-hour, 365-day service.  This restaurant's drive to always remain open has given rise to an informal but useful metric to determine the severity of a storm and the likely scale of assistance required for disaster recovery. It was coined by former administrator Craig Fugate of the Federal Emergency Management Agency (FEMA). The metric is unofficially used by FEMA to inform disaster response.

Description 
The index is based on Waffle House's reputation for having good disaster preparedness and staying open during extreme weather or reopening quickly afterwards.

Levels 
The index has three levels, based on the extent of operations and service at the restaurant following a storm:

 GREEN: full menu – Restaurant has power and damage is minimal or absent.
 YELLOW: limited menu – Power is either absent or delivered by a generator, or food supplies are running low.
 RED: the restaurant is closed – Indicates severe damage or severe flooding; Severe destruction to the restaurant.

Background 
The term was coined by FEMA Administrator Craig Fugate in May 2011, following the 2011 Joplin tornado, during which the two Waffle House restaurants in Joplin remained open.

The measure is based on the reputation of the restaurant chain Waffle House for staying open during extreme weather and for reopening quickly, albeit sometimes with a limited menu, after very severe weather events such as tornadoes or hurricanes. The chain's disaster preparedness measures include assembling and training "Waffle House jump teams" to facilitate fast reopening after disasters. Waffle House, along with other chains (such as Home Depot, Walmart, and Lowe's) which do a significant proportion of their business in the southern US where there is a frequent risk of hurricanes, have good risk management and disaster preparedness. Because of this, and the fact that a cut-down menu is prepared for times when there is no power or limited supplies, the Waffle House Index rarely reaches the red level.

The "Waffle House Index" sits alongside more formal measures of wind, rainfall, and other weather information, such as the Saffir–Simpson Hurricane Scale, which are used to indicate the intensity of a storm.

Dan Stoneking, FEMA director of external affairs, wrote in a FEMA blog post:

A FOIA request response in 2017 included emails saying that the Waffle House Index was a personal project of Craig Fugate's, denying a connection between the Waffle House Index and FEMA's National Business Emergency Operations Center.

See also 
 Big Mac Index
 Tornado intensity and damage

References

External links 
 FEMA Blog: News of the Day (July 7, 2011) – What do Waffle Houses Have to Do with Risk Management?
 Always Open | Georgia Tech Alumni Magazine
 Colbert Report segment on FEMA's Waffle House Index
 Data Crunch episode on  the Waffle House Index

2011 introductions
Federal Emergency Management Agency
Hazard scales
Waffle House